Barzun may refer to: 

 Jacques Barzun, French-American historian
 Matthew Barzun, US diplomat and business executive
 Barzun, Pyrénées-Atlantiques, a town in France